Aleksandr Vladimirovich Ivanitsky (10 December 1937 – 22 July 2020) was a Russian wrestler and Olympic champion in Freestyle wrestling who competed for the Soviet Union.

References

External links 
 
 

1937 births
2020 deaths
Sportspeople from Donetsk Oblast
Medalists at the 1964 Summer Olympics
Olympic gold medalists for the Soviet Union
Olympic wrestlers of the Soviet Union
Honoured Masters of Sport of the USSR
Recipients of the Medal of the Order "For Merit to the Fatherland" II class
Recipients of the Order of Friendship of Peoples
Recipients of the Order of the Red Banner of Labour
Russian male sport wrestlers
Soviet male sport wrestlers
World Wrestling Champions
Wrestlers at the 1964 Summer Olympics

Deaths by drowning